Donald "Don" Jowett (4 December 1866 – 27 August 1908) was an English rugby union footballer who played in the 1880s and 1890s. He played at representative level for England, and Yorkshire, and at club level for Heckmondwike, as a forward, e.g. front row, lock, or back row. Prior to the 1896–97 Northern Rugby Football Union season, Heckmondwike was a rugby union club.

Background
Don Jowett was born in Bradford, West Riding of Yorkshire, and he died aged 41 in Heckmondwike, West Riding of Yorkshire.

Playing career

International honours
Don Jowett won caps for England while at Heckmondwike in 1889 against New Zealand Natives, in 1890 against Scotland, and Ireland, and in 1891 against Wales, Ireland, and Scotland.

Change of Code
When Heckmondwike converted from the rugby union code to the rugby league code for the 1896–97 Northern Rugby Football Union season, Don Jowett would have been approximately 30 years of age. Consequently, he may have been both a rugby union and rugby league footballer for Heckmondwike.

Genealogical information
Don Jowett's marriage was registered during first ¼ 1892 in Dewsbury district.

References

External links
Search for "Jowett" at rugbyleagueproject.org
Biography of Arthur Budd with an England team photograph including Donald Jowett
Search for "Donald Jowett" at britishnewspaperarchive.co.uk
Search for "Don Jowett" at britishnewspaperarchive.co.uk

1866 births
1908 deaths
England international rugby union players
English rugby union players
Heckmondwike RFC players
Rugby union forwards
Rugby union players from Bradford
Yorkshire County RFU players